This is a list of the first women lawyer(s) and judge(s) in Maryland. It includes the year in which the women were admitted to practice law (in parentheses). Also included are women who achieved other distinctions such becoming the first in their state to graduate from law school or become a political figure.

Firsts in state history

Lawyers 

First female: Etta Haynie Maddox (1902)  
 First Jewish American female: Grace Rebecca Gerber Silverberg (1920)  
First African American female: Jane Cleo Marshall Lucas (1946)  
First African American female (actively practice): Juanita Jackson Mitchell (1950)

State judges 

 First female: Kathryn J. DuFour (1935) in 1955 
 First female (Maryland Special Court of Appeals): Rita Charmatz Davidson (1963) in 1972 
 First female (Maryland Court of Appeals): Rita Charmatz Davidson (1963) in 1979  
 First African American female: Mabel H. Hubbard (1975) in 1985  
 First Hispanic American (female): Audrey J.S. Carrion in 1995  
 First female (chief judge): Martha F. Rasin in 1996  
 First Muslim American female (preside over court): Zakia Mahasa in 1997  
 First Korean American female: Jeannie Hong (1993) in 2002  
 First openly LGBT (female): Halee F. Weinstein in 2002  
 First female (juvenile court): Bess B. Lavine  
 First African American female (Maryland Special Court of Appeals): Michele D. Hotten in 2010  
 First African-American female (Maryland Court of Appeals): Shirley M. Watts (1983) in 2013  
 First Asian American (female) (Maryland Special Court of Appeals): Rosalyn Tang in 2022 
 First Latino American (female) (Maryland Court of Appeals): Angela Eaves in 2022:

Federal judges 
 First female (United States District Court for the District of Maryland): Shirley Brannock Jones (1946) in 1979

Assistant Attorney General 

 First female: Shirley Brannock Jones (1946)

United States Attorney 

 First female: Catherine C. Blake in 2009

State's Attorney 

 First African American female: Toni E. Clarke from 1994 to 1995

District Attorney 

 First female: Susie Starp around 1974

Maryland State Bar Association
 

 First female admitted: Rose Zetzer (1946)  
 First female president: Louise Michaux Gonzales in 1991

Firsts in local history

 Alice C. Taylor: First female magistrate in Southern Maryland (1965)
 Elizabeth Morris: First African American female circuit judge in Anne Arundel County, Maryland (2018)
 Anne Colt Leitess: First female to serve as the State's Attorney for Anne Arundel County, Maryland (2018)
 Juanita Jackson Mitchell and Elaine Carsley Davis: First African American females to graduate from the Maryland School of Law (1950)
 Patricia C. Jessamy: First female to serve as the State's Attorney for Baltimore, Maryland (1995)
 Audrey J.S. Carrion: First Hispanic American (female) to serve as a Judge of the Circuit Court for Baltimore City, Maryland (1995)
 Phoebe A. Haddon: First African American (female) to serve as the Dean of the University of Maryland Francis King Carey School of Law (2009)
 Jeanette Rosner Wolman (1957): First female lawyer admitted to the Bar Association of Baltimore City [Baltimore County, Maryland]
 Wanda Keyes Heard (1982): First female (and African American female) appointed as the Chief Judge of the Baltimore City Circuit Court (2017) [Baltimore City, Maryland]
 JoAnn Ellinghaus-Jones (1981): First female judge in Carroll County, Maryland
 Maria Oesterreicher: First female to become a Judge of the Circuit Court in Carroll County, Maryland (2018)
 Bonnie G. Schneider (1988): First female judge in Cecil County, Maryland
 Donine Carrington (1995): First African American female to serve on the  Charles County Circuit Court (2017) [Charles County, Maryland]
 Betty Bright Nelson (c. 1950s): First woman to practice law in Dorchester County, Maryland
 Mary Ann Stepler (1974): First female judge in Frederick County, Maryland
 Yolanda L. Curtin: First Latino female to serve on the  Harford County Circuit Court, Maryland (2013)
 Diane O. Leasure and Donna Hill Staton: First females to serve as a Judge of the Howard County Circuit Court in Maryland (1995). Staton is the first African American (female) judge appointed to the circuit court.
 Alice Gail Pollard Clark: First African American (female) to serve as district judge for Howard County, Maryland (1997)
 Vivian V. Simpson (c. 1930s): First female lawyer in Montgomery County, Maryland
 Irma S. Raker: First African American female to serve as the Assistant State's Attorney of Montgomery County, Maryland
 Marielsa A. Bernard (1981): First Hispanic American female to serve as a district court judge (1998) and circuit court judge (2002) in Montgomery County, Maryland
 Sharon V. Burrell (1984): First African American female to serve on the  Montgomery County Circuit Court (c. 2008) [Montgomery County, Maryland]
 Karla Smith (1995): First African American female to serve on the  Montgomery County District Court (2012) [Montgomery County, Maryland]
 Toni E. Clarke: First African-American female to serve as the State's Attorney for Prince George's County, Maryland (1994-1995). She was the first African-American (female) to serve as the President of the Prince George's County Bar Association.
 Angela Alsobrooks: First African American female elected to serve as the State's Attorney for Prince George's County, Maryland (2010)
 Gladys Weatherspoon: First Latino American female (who is of Dominican descent) judge in Prince George's County, Maryland (2020)
 Llamilet Gutierrez: First Hispanic American (female) to serve as a Judge of Prince George’s County District Court (2023)
 Gina Circincion: First female to serve as the State's Attorney for Washington County, Maryland (2022)
 Grace Gerber (1920): First female (and Jewish American female) lawyer in Hagerstown, Maryland [Washington County, Maryland]
 Sally D. Adkins: First female to serve as a Judge of the Wicomico County Circuit Court (1996)
 Peggy Kent (c. 1980): First female judge in Worcester County (2018)
 Kris Heiser: First female to serve as the State's Attorney for Worcester County (2019)

See also  

 List of first women lawyers and judges in the United States
 Timeline of women lawyers in the United States
 Women in law

Other topics of interest 

 List of first minority male lawyers and judges in the United States
 List of first minority male lawyers and judges in Maryland

References 

Lawyers, Maryland, first
Maryland, first
Women, Maryland, first
Women, Maryland, first
Women in Maryland
Lists of people from Maryland
Maryland lawyers